This is a list of butterflies of Nigeria. About 1,319 species are known from Nigeria, 50 of which are endemic.

Papilionidae

Papilioninae

Papilionini
Papilio antimachus Drury, 1782
Papilio zalmoxis Hewitson, 1864
Papilio nireus Linnaeus, 1758
Papilio charopus Westwood, 1843
Papilio chrapkowskoides nurettini Koçak, 1983
Papilio sosia Rothschild & Jordan, 1903
Papilio cynorta Fabricius, 1793
Papilio plagiatus Aurivillius, 1898
Papilio dardanus Brown, 1776
Papilio phorcas phorcas Cramer, 1775
Papilio phorcas congoanus Rothschild, 1896
Papilio rex schultzei Aurivillius, 1904
Papilio zenobia Fabricius, 1775
Papilio cyproeofila cyproeofila Butler, 1868
Papilio cyproeofila praecyola Suffert, 1904
Papilio gallienus Distant, 1879
Papilio demodocus Esper, [1798]
Papilio hesperus Westwood, 1843
Papilio menestheus Drury, 1773

Leptocercini
Graphium antheus (Cramer, 1779)
Graphium policenes policenes (Cramer, 1775)
Graphium policenes telloi Hecq, 1999
Graphium liponesco (Suffert, 1904)
Graphium biokoensis (Gauthier, 1984)
Graphium polistratus (Grose-Smith, 1889)
Graphium illyris hamatus (Joicey & Talbot, 1918)
Graphium angolanus baronis (Ungemach, 1932)
Graphium ridleyanus (White, 1843)
Graphium leonidas (Fabricius, 1793)
Graphium tynderaeus (Fabricius, 1793)
Graphium latreillianus theorini (Aurivillius, 1881)
Graphium adamastor (Boisduval, 1836)
Graphium agamedes (Westwood, 1842)
Graphium almansor escherichi (Gaede, 1915)
Graphium ucalegon (Hewitson, 1865)
Graphium simoni (Aurivillius, 1899)

Pieridae

Pseudopontiinae
Pseudopontia paradoxa (Felder & Felder, 1869)

Coliadinae
Eurema brigitta (Stoll, [1780])
Eurema desjardinsii marshalli (Butler, 1898)
Eurema regularis (Butler, 1876)
Eurema floricola leonis (Butler, 1886)
Eurema hapale (Mabille, 1882)
Eurema hecabe solifera (Butler, 1875)
Eurema senegalensis (Boisduval, 1836)
Colias electo manengoubensis Darge, 1968

Pierinae
Colotis amata calais (Cramer, 1775)
Colotis antevippe (Boisduval, 1836)
Colotis aurora evarne (Klug, 1829)
Colotis celimene sudanicus (Aurivillius, 1905)
Colotis chrysonome (Klug, 1829)
Colotis daira stygia (Felder & Felder, 1865)
Colotis danae eupompe (Klug, 1829)
Colotis elgonensis glauningi (Schultze, 1909)
Colotis euippe (Linnaeus, 1758)
Colotis evagore antigone (Boisduval, 1836)
Colotis halimede (Klug, 1829)
Colotis ione (Godart, 1819)
Colotis liagore (Klug, 1829)
Colotis phisadia (Godart, 1819)
Colotis protomedia (Klug, 1829)
Colotis vesta amelia (Lucas, 1852)
Colotis eris (Klug, 1829)
Eronia cleodora Hübner, 1823
Eronia leda (Boisduval, 1847)
Pinacopterix eriphia tritogenia (Klug, 1829)
Nepheronia argia (Fabricius, 1775)
Nepheronia buquetii (Boisduval, 1836)
Nepheronia pharis (Boisduval, 1836)
Nepheronia thalassina (Boisduval, 1836)
Leptosia alcesta (Stoll, [1782])
Leptosia hybrida Bernardi, 1952
Leptosia marginea (Mabille, 1890)
Leptosia medusa (Cramer, 1777)
Leptosia nupta (Butler, 1873)
Leptosia wigginsi pseudalcesta Bernardi, 1965

Pierini
Appias epaphia (Cramer, [1779])
Appias phaola (Doubleday, 1847)
Appias sabina (Felder & Felder, [1865])
Appias sylvia (Fabricius, 1775)
Mylothris aburi Larsen & Collins, 2003
Mylothris asphodelus Butler, 1888
Mylothris chloris (Fabricius, 1775)
Mylothris eximia Hecq, 2005 (endemic)
Mylothris flaviana Grose-Smith, 1898
Mylothris hilara (Karsch, 1892)
Mylothris jacksoni knutssoni Aurivillius, 1891
Mylothris jaopura Karsch, 1893
Mylothris knoopi Hecq, 2005 (endemic)
Mylothris lucens Hecq, 2005 (endemic)
Mylothris ochracea Aurivillius, 1895
Mylothris rembina (Plötz, 1880)
Mylothris rhodope (Fabricius, 1775)
Mylothris rueppellii josi Larsen, 1986
Mylothris schumanni Suffert, 1904
Mylothris sjostedti Aurivillius, 1895
Mylothris sulphurea Aurivillius, 1895
Mylothris primulina Butler, 1897 (endemic)
Mylothris yulei bansoana Talbot, 1944
Dixeia capricornus (Ward, 1871)
Dixeia cebron (Ward, 1871)
Dixeia doxo (Godart, 1819)
Dixeia orbona (Geyer, [1837])
Belenois aurota (Fabricius, 1793)
Belenois calypso (Drury, 1773)
Belenois creona (Cramer, [1776])
Belenois gidica (Godart, 1819)
Belenois hedyle (Cramer, 1777)
Belenois solilucis Butler, 1874
Belenois subeida (Felder & Felder, 1865)
Belenois theora (Doubleday, 1846)
Belenois theuszi (Dewitz, 1889)
Belenois zochalia connexiva (Joicey & Talbot, 1927)

Lycaenidae

Miletinae

Liphyrini
Euliphyra hewitsoni Aurivillius, 1899
Euliphyra mirifica Holland, 1890
Euliphyra leucyania (Hewitson, 1874)
Aslauga bella Bethune-Baker, 1913
Aslauga camerunica Stempffer, 1969
Aslauga ernesti (Karsch, 1895)
Aslauga lamborni Bethune-Baker, 1914
Aslauga marginalis Kirby, 1890
Aslauga marshalli adamaoua Libert, 1994
Aslauga vininga (Hewitson, 1875)

Miletini
Megalopalpus angulosus Grünberg, 1910
Megalopalpus metaleucus Karsch, 1893
Megalopalpus simplex Röber, 1886
Megalopalpus zymna (Westwood, 1851)
Spalgis lemolea lemolea Druce, 1890
Spalgis lemolea pilos Druce, 1890
Lachnocnema emperamus (Snellen, 1872)
Lachnocnema divergens Gaede, 1915
Lachnocnema vuattouxi Libert, 1996
Lachnocnema reutlingeri Holland, 1892
Lachnocnema luna Druce, 1910
Lachnocnema magna Aurivillius, 1895
Lachnocnema albimacula Libert, 1996
Lachnocnema exiguus Holland, 1890
Lachnocnema disrupta Talbot, 1935

Poritiinae

Liptenini
Alaena exotica Collins & Larsen, 2005 (endemic)
Ptelina carnuta (Hewitson, 1873)
Pentila maculata (Kirby, 1887)
Pentila camerunica Stempffer & Bennett, 1961
Pentila glagoessa (Holland, 1893)
Pentila hewitsoni hewitsoni (Grose-Smith & Kirby, 1887)
Pentila hewitsoni limbata (Holland, 1893)
Pentila nigeriana Stempffer & Bennett, 1961 (endemic)
Pentila occidentalium Aurivillius, 1899
Pentila pauli Staudinger, 1888
Pentila petreia Hewitson, 1874
Pentila picena catori Bethune-Baker, 1906
Pentila picena cydaria (Grose-Smith, 1898)
Pentila pseudorotha Stempffer & Bennett, 1961
Pentila tachyroides Dewitz, 1879
Pentila umangiana prodita Schultze, 1923
Telipna acraea acraea (Westwood, [1851])
Telipna acraea fervida (Grose-Smith & Kirby, 1890)
Telipna rothi (Grose-Smith, 1898) (endemic)
Telipna albofasciata Aurivillius, 1910
Telipna cameroonensis Jackson, 1969
Telipna rufilla (Grose-Smith, 1901) (endemic)
Telipna sanguinea (Plötz, 1880)
Telipna ruspinoides Schultze, 1923
Ornipholidotos kirbyi (Aurivillius. 1895)
Ornipholidotos maesseni Libert, 2005
Ornipholidotos boormani Libert, 2005 (endemic)
Ornipholidotos nigeriae Stempffer, 1964
Ornipholidotos onitshae Stempffer, 1962
Ornipholidotos nympha Libert, 2000
Torbenia larseni (Stempffer, 1969)
Torbenia wojtusiaki Libert, 2000
Torbenia persimilis Libert, 2000
Mimacraea charmian Grose-Smith & Kirby, 1889
Mimacraea darwinia Butler, 1872
Mimacraea apicalis Grose-Smith & Kirby, 1889
Mimacraea maesseni Libert, 2000
Mimacraea neurata Holland, 1895
Mimeresia cellularis (Kirby, 1890)
Mimeresia debora debora (Kirby, 1890)
Mimeresia debora catori (Bethune-Baker, 1904)
Mimeresia dinora (Kirby, 1890)
Mimeresia drucei owerri Stempffer, 1961
Mimeresia libentina (Hewitson, 1866)
Liptena albicans Cator, 1904
Liptena alluaudi Mabille, 1890
Liptena augusta Suffert, 1904
Liptena bassae Bethune-Baker, 1926 (endemic)
Liptena bolivari Kheil, 1905
Liptena catalina (Grose-Smith & Kirby, 1887)
Liptena decipiens (Kirby, 1890)
Liptena despecta (Holland, 1890)
Liptena eketi Bethune-Baker, 1926
Liptena eukrinaria Bethune-Baker, 1926
Liptena evanescens (Kirby, 1887)
Liptena fatima (Kirby, 1890)
Liptena ferrymani (Grose-Smith & Kirby, 1891)
Liptena flavicans oniens Talbot, 1935
Liptena ilaro Stempffer, Bennett & May, 1974 (endemic)
Liptena modesta (Kirby, 1890)
Liptena opaca (Kirby, 1890)
Liptena orubrum (Holland, 1890)
Liptena pearmani Stempffer, Bennett & May, 1974
Liptena priscilla Larsen, 1995 (endemic)
Liptena rochei Stempffer, 1951
Liptena sauberi Schultze, 1912
Liptena septistrigata (Bethune-Baker, 1903)
Liptena similis (Kirby, 1890)
Liptena simplicia Möschler, 1887
Liptena submacula Lathy, 1903
Liptena titei Stempffer, Bennett & May, 1974
Liptena xanthostola (Holland, 1890)
Obania subvariegata (Grose-Smith & Kirby, 1890)
Obania tullia (Staudinger, 1892)
Kakumia otlauga (Grose-Smith & Kirby, 1890)
Tetrarhanis nubifera (Druce, 1910)
Tetrarhanis ogojae (Stempffer, 1961)
Tetrarhanis okwangwo Larsen, 1998
Tetrarhanis onitshae (Stempffer, 1962) (endemic)
Tetrarhanis simplex (Aurivillius, 1895)
Tetrarhanis stempfferi (Berger, 1954)
Tetrarhanis symplocus Clench, 1965
Falcuna campimus (Holland, 1890)
Falcuna gitte Bennett, 1969 (endemic)
Falcuna libyssa (Hewitson, 1866)
Larinopoda aspidos Druce, 1890
Larinopoda lagyra (Hewitson, 1866)
Larinopoda lircaea (Hewitson, 1866)
Micropentila adelgitha (Hewitson, 1874)
Micropentila adelgunda (Staudinger, 1892)
Micropentila brunnea (Kirby, 1887)
Micropentila dorothea Bethune-Baker, 1903
Micropentila flavopunctata Stempffer & Bennett, 1965
Micropentila fuscula (Grose-Smith, 1898)
Micropentila nigeriana Stempffer & Bennett, 1965
Micropentila ogojae Stempffer & Bennett, 1965
Pseuderesia eleaza (Hewitson, 1873)
Eresina fontainei Stempffer, 1956
Eresina fusca (Cator, 1904)
Eresina jacksoni Stempffer, 1961
Eresina maesseni Stempffer, 1956
Eresina pseudofusca Stempffer, 1961
Eresina rougeoti Stempffer, 1956
Eresina saundersi Stempffer, 1956
Eresina schmitti Larsen, 2005 (endemic)
Eresina theodori Stempffer, 1956
Eresiomera bicolor (Grose-Smith & Kirby, 1890)
Eresiomera cornesi (Stempffer, 1969) (endemic)
Eresiomera isca isca (Hewitson, 1873)
Eresiomera isca occidentalis Collins & Larsen, 1998
Eresiomera nigeriana (Stempffer, 1962) (endemic)
Citrinophila erastus (Hewitson, 1866)
Citrinophila marginalis Kirby, 1887
Citrinophila similis (Kirby, 1887)
Citrinophila tenera (Kirby, 1887)
Argyrocheila undifera Staudinger, 1892

Epitolini
Toxochitona gerda (Kirby, 1890)
Iridana exquisita (Grose-Smith, 1898)
Iridana incredibilis (Staudinger, 1891)
Iridana nigeriana Stempffer, 1964
Iridana rougeoti Stempffer, 1964
Teratoneura isabellae Dudgeon, 1909
Epitola posthumus (Fabricius, 1793)
Epitola urania Kirby, 1887
Cerautola ceraunia (Hewitson, 1873)
Cerautola crowleyi (Sharpe, 1890)
Cerautola legeri Libert, 1999 (endemic)
Cerautola miranda miranda (Staudinger, 1889)
Cerautola miranda vidua (Talbot, 1935)
Cerautola semibrunnea (Bethune-Baker, 1916)
Geritola daveyi (Roche, 1954)
Geritola frankdaveyi Libert, 1999 (endemic)
Geritola gerina (Hewitson, 1878)
Geritola goodii (Holland, 1890)
Geritola virginea (Bethune-Baker, 1904)
Stempfferia annae Libert, 1999
Stempfferia boormani Libert, 1999 (endemic)
Stempfferia carcina (Hewitson, 1873)
Stempfferia cercene (Hewitson, 1873)
Stempfferia cercenoides (Holland, 1890)
Stempfferia congoana (Aurivillius, 1923)
Stempfferia elissa (Grose-Smith, 1898)
Stempfferia francisci Libert, 1999 (endemic)
Stempfferia gordoni (Druce, 1903)
Stempfferia ife Libert, 1999 (endemic)
Stempfferia katherinae (Poulton, 1929) (endemic)
Stempfferia kholifa (Bethune-Baker, 1904)
Stempfferia marginata (Kirby, 1887)
Stempfferia michelae michelae Libert, 1999
Stempfferia michelae centralis Libert, 1999
Stempfferia moyambina (Bethune-Baker, 1903)
Stempfferia subtumescens Libert, 1999 (endemic)
Stempfferia tumentia (Druce, 1910)
Stempfferia uniformis (Kirby, 1887) (endemic)
Stempfferia zelza (Hewitson, 1873)
Cephetola cephena (Hewitson, 1873)
Cephetola collinsi Libert & Larsen, 1999
Cephetola mercedes (Suffert, 1904)
Cephetola nigeriae (Jackson, 1962)
Cephetola nigra (Bethune-Baker, 1903)
Cephetola obscura (Hawker-Smith, 1933)
Cephetola pinodes pinodes (Druce, 1890)
Cephetola pinodes budduana (Talbot, 1937)
Cephetola subcoerulea (Roche, 1954)
Cephetola sublustris (Bethune-Baker, 1904)
Tumerepedes flava Bethune-Baker, 1913 (endemic)
Neaveia lamborni Druce, 1910
Epitolina dispar (Kirby, 1887)
Epitolina melissa (Druce, 1888)
Epitolina collinsi Libert, 2000
Epitolina catori Bethune-Baker, 1904
Epitolina larseni Libert, 2000
Hypophytala benitensis (Holland, 1890)
Hypophytala henleyi (Kirby, 1890)
Hypophytala hyettoides (Aurivillius, 1895)
Hypophytala nigrescens (Jackson, 1964) (endemic)
Hypophytala ultramarina Libert & Collins, 1999
Phytala elais Westwood, 1851
Aethiopana honorius honorius (Fabricius, 1793)
Aethiopana honorius divisa (Butler, 1901)
Hewitsonia bitjeana Bethune-Baker, 1915
Hewitsonia beryllina Schultze, 1916
Hewitsonia boisduvalii boisduvalii (Hewitson, 1869)
Hewitsonia boisduvalii borealis Schultze, 1916
Hewitsonia danane Stempffer, 1969
Hewitsonia inexpectata Bouyer, 1997
Hewitsonia kirbyi Dewitz, 1879
Hewitsonia occidentalis Bouyer, 1997

Aphnaeinae
Pseudaletis agrippina Druce, 1888
Pseudaletis cornesi Collins & Libert, 2007 (endemic)
Pseudaletis catori Bethune-Baker, 1926
Pseudaletis clymenus (Druce, 1885)
Pseudaletis zebra Holland, 1891
Pseudaletis taeniata Libert, 2007
Pseudaletis leonis (Staudinger, 1888)
Pseudaletis antimachus (Staudinger, 1888)
Lipaphnaeus aderna (Plötz, 1880)
Lipaphnaeus leonina bitje (Druce, 1910)
Lipaphnaeus leonina ivoirensis Stempffer, 1966
Cigaritis avriko (Karsch, 1893)
Cigaritis buchanani (Rothschild, 1921)
Cigaritis crustaria (Holland, 1890)
Cigaritis menelas (Druce, 1907)
Cigaritis mozambica (Bertoloni, 1850)
Cigaritis nilus (Hewitson, 1865)
Zeritis neriene Boisduval, 1836
Axiocerses harpax (Fabricius, 1775)
Axiocerses callaghani Henning & Henning, 1996
Axiocerses amanga borealis Aurivillius, 1905
Aphnaeus argyrocyclus Holland, 1890
Aphnaeus asterius Plötz, 1880
Aphnaeus brahami Lathy, 1903
Aphnaeus orcas (Drury, 1782)

Theclinae
Myrina silenus (Fabricius, 1775)
Myrina subornata Lathy, 1903
Oxylides albata (Aurivillius, 1895)
Oxylides faunus faunus (Drury, 1773)
Oxylides faunus camerunica Libert, 2004
Syrmoptera amasa (Hewitson, 1869)
Syrmoptera bonifacei Stempffer, 1961
Dapidodigma demeter Clench, 1961
Dapidodigma hymen (Fabricius, 1775)
Hypolycaena anara Larsen, 1986
Hypolycaena antifaunus (Westwood, 1851)
Hypolycaena coerulea Aurivillius, 1895
Hypolycaena dubia Aurivillius, 1895
Hypolycaena hatita Hewitson, 1865
Hypolycaena kadiskos Druce, 1890
Hypolycaena kakumi Larsen, 1997
Hypolycaena lebona (Hewitson, 1865)
Hypolycaena liara Druce, 1890
Hypolycaena nigra Bethune-Baker, 1914
Hypolycaena philippus (Fabricius, 1793)
Hypolycaena scintillans Stempffer, 1957
Iolaus eurisus (Cramer, 1779)
Iolaus aethria Karsch, 1893
Iolaus agnes Aurivillius, 1898
Iolaus alienus bicaudatus Aurivillius, 1905
Iolaus aurivillii Röber, 1900
Iolaus bellina (Plötz, 1880)
Iolaus coelestis Bethune-Baker, 1926
Iolaus creta Hewitson, 1878
Iolaus cytaeis Hewitson, 1875
Iolaus farquharsoni (Bethune-Baker, 1922)
Iolaus adorabilis Collins & Larsen, 2008
Iolaus fontainei (Stempffer, 1956)
Iolaus frater kumboae (Bethune-Baker, 1926)
Iolaus gemmarius (Druce, 1910)
Iolaus iasis Hewitson, 1865
Iolaus laon Hewitson, 1878
Iolaus longicauda (Stempffer & Bennett, 1959)
Iolaus maesa (Hewitson, 1862)
Iolaus neavei (Druce, 1910)
Iolaus normani (Larsen, 1986)
Iolaus pollux Aurivillius, 1895
Iolaus sappirus (Druce, 1902)
Iolaus scintillans Aurivillius, 1905
Iolaus sciophilus (Schultze, 1916)
Iolaus sudanicus Aurivillius, 1905
Iolaus menas Druce, 1890
Iolaus iulus Hewitson, 1869
Iolaus parasilanus maesseni (Stempffer & Bennett, 1958)
Iolaus ismenias (Klug, 1834)
Iolaus newporti Larsen, 1994 (endemic)
Iolaus alcibiades Kirby, 1871
Iolaus paneperata Druce, 1890
Iolaus lukabas Druce, 1890
Iolaus calisto (Westwood, 1851)
Iolaus laonides Aurivillius, 1898
Iolaus poecilaon (Riley, 1928)
Iolaus ofere Collins & Larsen,2008
Iolaus timon (Fabricius, 1787)
Iolaus catori Bethune-Baker, 1904
Stugeta marmoreus (Butler, 1866)
Pilodeudorix mimeta mimeta (Karsch, 1895)
Pilodeudorix mimeta oreas Libert, 2004
Pilodeudorix ula (Karsch, 1895)
Pilodeudorix virgata (Druce, 1891)
Pilodeudorix anetia (Hulstaert, 1924)
Pilodeudorix angelita schultzei (Aurivillius, 1907)
Pilodeudorix aruma aruma (Hewitson, 1873)
Pilodeudorix aruma nigeriana Libert, 2004
Pilodeudorix catori (Bethune-Baker, 1903)
Pilodeudorix infuscata (Stempffer, 1964)
Pilodeudorix leonina dimitris (d'Abrera, 1980)
Pilodeudorix mera (Hewitson, 1873
Pilodeudorix otraeda genuba (Hewitson, 1875)
Pilodeudorix caerulea (Druce, 1890)
Pilodeudorix camerona (Plötz, 1880)
Pilodeudorix congoana (Aurivillius, 1923)
Pilodeudorix diyllus (Hewitson, 1878)
Pilodeudorix zela (Hewitson, 1869)
Pilodeudorix aucta (Karsch, 1895)
Pilodeudorix hugoi Libert, 2004
Pilodeudorix catalla (Karsch, 1895)
Pilodeudorix deritas (Hewitson, 1874)
Pilodeudorix pseudoderitas (Stempffer, 1964)
Pilodeudorix violetta (Aurivillius, 1897)
Paradeudorix boormani (Larsen, 1996) (endemic)
Paradeudorix cobaltina (Stempffer, 1964)
Paradeudorix eleala eleala (Hewitson, 1865)
Paradeudorix eleala viridis (Stempffer, 1964)
Paradeudorix ituri (Bethune-Baker, 1908)
Paradeudorix marginata (Stempffer, 1962)
Paradeudorix moyambina (Bethune-Baker, 1904)
Paradeudorix petersi (Stempffer & Bennett, 1956)
Hypomyrina mimetica Libert, 2004
Hypomyrina fournierae Gabriel, 1939
Deudorix antalus (Hopffer, 1855)
Deudorix caliginosa Lathy, 1903
Deudorix dinochares Grose-Smith, 1887
Deudorix dinomenes diomedes Jackson, 1966
Deudorix galathea (Swainson, 1821)
Deudorix lorisona (Hewitson, 1862)
Deudorix odana Druce, 1887
Capys stuarti Collins & Larsen, 2000 (endemic)

Polyommatinae

Lycaenesthini
Anthene afra (Bethune-Baker, 1910)
Anthene amarah (Guérin-Méneville, 1849)
Anthene crawshayi (Butler, 1899)
Anthene definita (Butler, 1899)
Anthene emkopoti Larsen & Collins, 1998
Anthene flavomaculatus (Grose-Smith & Kirby, 1893)
Anthene irumu (Stempffer, 1948)
Anthene juba (Fabricius, 1787)
Anthene kampala (Bethune-Baker, 1910)
Anthene lachares (Hewitson, 1878)
Anthene larydas (Cramer, 1780)
Anthene leptines (Hewitson, 1874)
Anthene ligures (Hewitson, 1874)
Anthene liodes (Hewitson, 1874)
Anthene locuples (Grose-Smith, 1898)
Anthene lunulata (Trimen, 1894)
Anthene lychnides (Hewitson, 1878)
Anthene lysicles (Hewitson, 1874)
Anthene mahota (Grose-Smith, 1887)
Anthene kikuyu (Bethune-Baker, 1910)
Anthene princeps (Butler, 1876)
Anthene rubricinctus (Holland, 1891)
Anthene scintillula scintillula (Holland, 1891)
Anthene scintillula aurea (Bethune-Baker, 1910)
Anthene sylvanus (Drury, 1773)
Anthene versatilis bitje (Druce, 1910)
Anthene lamprocles (Hewitson, 1878)
Anthene lyzanius (Hewitson, 1874)
Anthene chryseostictus (Bethune-Baker, 1910)
Anthene fulvus Stempffer, 1962
Anthene lusones (Hewitson, 1874)
Anthene staudingeri (Grose-Smith & Kirby, 1894)
Anthene africana (Bethune-Baker, 1926)
Anthene coerulea (Aurivillius, 1895)
Anthene fasciatus (Aurivillius, 1895)
Anthene hades (Bethune-Baker, 1910)
Anthene inconspicua (Druce, 1910)
Anthene lacides (Hewitson, 1874)
Anthene lamias (Hewitson, 1878)
Anthene lucretilis (Hewitson, 1874)
Anthene marshalli (Bethune-Baker, 1903)
Anthene nigeriae (Aurivillius, 1905)
Anthene obscura (Druce, 1910)
Anthene phoenicis (Karsch, 1893)
Anthene rufoplagata (Bethune-Baker, 1910)
Cupidesthes arescopa Bethune-Baker, 1910
Cupidesthes leonina (Bethune-Baker, 1903)
Cupidesthes lithas (Druce, 1890)
Cupidesthes mimetica (Druce, 1910)
Cupidesthes paralithas Bethune-Baker, 1926
Cupidesthes robusta Aurivillius, 1895

Polyommatini
Cupidopsis cissus (Godart, [1824])
Cupidopsis jobates mauritanica Riley, 1932
Pseudonacaduba aethiops (Mabille, 1877)
Pseudonacaduba sichela (Wallengren, 1857)
Lampides boeticus (Linnaeus, 1767)
Uranothauma antinorii bamendanus Libert, 1993
Uranothauma falkensteini (Dewitz, 1879)
Uranothauma frederikkae Libert, 1993
Uranothauma heritsia (Hewitson, 1876)
Uranothauma nubifer (Trimen, 1895)
Phlyaria cyara cyara (Hewitson, 1876)
Phlyaria cyara stactalla Karsch, 1895
Cacyreus audeoudi Stempffer, 1936
Cacyreus lingeus (Stoll, 1782)
Cacyreus virilis Stempffer, 1936
Leptotes babaulti (Stempffer, 1935)
Leptotes brevidentatus (Tite, 1958)
Leptotes jeanneli (Stempffer, 1935)
Leptotes pirithous (Linnaeus, 1767)
Leptotes pulchra (Murray, 1874)
Tuxentius carana carana (Hewitson, 1876)
Tuxentius carana kontu (Karsch, 1893)
Tuxentius cretosus nodieri (Oberthür, 1883)
Tuxentius margaritaceus (Sharpe, 1892)
Tarucus kiki Larsen, 1976
Tarucus legrasi Stempffer, 1948
Tarucus rosacea (Austaut, 1885)
Tarucus theophrastus (Fabricius, 1793)
Tarucus ungemachi Stempffer, 1942
Zizeeria knysna (Trimen, 1862)
Zizina antanossa (Mabille, 1877)
Actizera lucida (Trimen, 1883)
Zizula hylax (Fabricius, 1775)
Azanus jesous (Guérin-Méneville, 1849)
Azanus mirza (Plötz, 1880)
Azanus moriqua (Wallengren, 1857)
Azanus natalensis (Trimen & Bowker, 1887)
Azanus ubaldus (Stoll, 1782)
Azanus isis (Drury, 1773)
Eicochrysops dudgeoni Riley, 1929
Eicochrysops hippocrates (Fabricius, 1793)
Euchrysops alberta (Butler, 1901)
Euchrysops albistriata greenwoodi d'Abrera, 1980
Euchrysops banyo Libert, 2001
Euchrysops malathana (Boisduval, 1833)
Euchrysops nilotica (Aurivillius, 1904)
Euchrysops osiris (Hopffer, 1855)
Euchrysops reducta Hulstaert, 1924
Euchrysops sagba Libert, 1993
Euchrysops sahelianus Libert, 2001
Euchrysops subpallida Bethune-Baker, 1923
Thermoniphas alberici (Dufrane, 1945)
Thermoniphas fumosa Stempffer, 1952
Thermoniphas micylus (Cramer, 1780)
Thermoniphas togara (Plötz, 1880)
Oboronia guessfeldti (Dewitz, 1879)
Oboronia ornata (Mabille, 1890)
Oboronia pseudopunctatus (Strand, 1912)
Oboronia punctatus (Dewitz, 1879)
Chilades eleusis (Demaison, 1888)
Freyeria trochylus (Freyer, [1843])
Lepidochrysops dunni Larsen & Collins, 2003 (endemic)
Lepidochrysops parsimon (Fabricius, 1775)
Lepidochrysops polydialecta (Bethune-Baker, [1923])
Lepidochrysops quassi (Karsh, 1895)
Lepidochrysops ringa Tite, 1959
Lepidochrysops vera Tite, 1961 (endemic)
Lepidochrysops victoriae occidentalis Libert & Collins, 2001

Riodinidae

Nemeobiinae
Abisara tantalus caerulea Carpenter & Jackson, 1950
Abisara intermedia Aurivillius, 1895
Abisara talantus Aurivillius, 1891
Abisara rutherfordii Hewitson, 1874
Abisara gerontes (Fabricius, 1781)
Abisara rogersi Druce, 1878
Abisara cameroonensis Callaghan, 2003
Abisara neavei latifasciata Riley, 1932

Nymphalidae

Libytheinae
Libythea labdaca Westwood, 1851

Danainae

Danaini
Danaus chrysippus alcippus (Cramer, 1777)
Tirumala formosa morgeni (Honrath, 1892)
Tirumala petiverana (Doubleday, 1847)
Amauris niavius (Linnaeus, 1758)
Amauris tartarea Mabille, 1876
Amauris crawshayi camerunica Joicey & Talbot, 1925
Amauris damocles (Fabricius, 1793)
Amauris echeria occidentalis Schmidt, 1921
Amauris hecate (Butler, 1866)
Amauris vashti (Butler, 1869)

Satyrinae

Elymniini
Elymniopsis bammakoo (Westwood, [1851])

Melanitini
Gnophodes betsimena parmeno Doubleday, 1849
Gnophodes chelys (Fabricius, 1793)
Melanitis leda (Linnaeus, 1758)
Melanitis libya Distant, 1882
Aphysoneura scapulifascia occidentalis Joicey & Talbot, 1924

Satyrini
Bicyclus analis (Aurivillius, 1895)
Bicyclus angulosa (Butler, 1868)
Bicyclus anisops (Karsch, 1892)
Bicyclus auricruda fulgidus Fox, 1963
Bicyclus buea (Strand, 1912)
Bicyclus campus (Karsch, 1893)
Bicyclus dorothea (Cramer, 1779)
Bicyclus ephorus Weymer, 1892
Bicyclus evadne elionias (Hewitson, 1866)
Bicyclus golo (Aurivillius, 1893)
Bicyclus graueri choveti Libert, 1996
Bicyclus hewitsoni (Doumet, 1861)
Bicyclus hyperanthus (Bethune-Baker, 1908)
Bicyclus iccius (Hewitson, 1865)
Bicyclus ignobilis ignobilis (Butler, 1870)
Bicyclus ignobilis eurini Condamin & Fox, 1963
Bicyclus istaris (Plötz, 1880)
Bicyclus italus (Hewitson, 1865)
Bicyclus madetes (Hewitson, 1874)
Bicyclus mandanes Hewitson, 1873
Bicyclus medontias (Hewitson, 1873)
Bicyclus milyas (Hewitson, 1864)
Bicyclus nobilis (Aurivillius, 1893)
Bicyclus pavonis (Butler, 1876)
Bicyclus procora (Karsch, 1893)
Bicyclus rhacotis (Hewitson, 1866)
Bicyclus safitza (Westwood, 1850)
Bicyclus sambulos (Hewitson, 1877)
Bicyclus martius sanaos (Hewitson, 1866)
Bicyclus sandace (Hewitson, 1877)
Bicyclus sangmelinae Condamin, 1963
Bicyclus saussurei camerunia (Strand, 1914)
Bicyclus sciathis (Hewitson, 1866)
Bicyclus smithi (Aurivillius, 1899)
Bicyclus sophrosyne (Plötz, 1880)
Bicyclus sweadneri Fox, 1963
Bicyclus sylvicolus Condamin, 1965
Bicyclus taenias (Hewitson, 1877)
Bicyclus technatis (Hewitson, 1877)
Bicyclus trilophus jacksoni Condamin, 1961
Bicyclus vulgaris (Butler, 1868)
Bicyclus xeneas xeneas (Hewitson, 1866)
Bicyclus xeneas occidentalis Condamin, 1965
Bicyclus xeneoides Condamin, 1961
Hallelesis asochis (Hewitson, 1866)
Heteropsis peitho (Plötz, 1880)
Ypthima albida occidentalis Bartel, 1905
Ypthima antennata cornesi Kielland, 1982
Ypthima asterope (Klug, 1832)
Ypthima condamini nigeriae Kielland, 1982
Ypthima doleta Kirby, 1880
Ypthima impura Elwes & Edwards, 1893
Ypthima pulchra Overlaet, 1954
Ypthima pupillaris Butler, 1888
Ypthima vuattouxi Kielland, 1982
Ypthimomorpha itonia (Hewitson, 1865)

Charaxinae

Charaxini
Charaxes varanes vologeses (Mabille, 1876)
Charaxes fulvescens fulvescens (Aurivillius, 1891)
Charaxes fulvescens senegala van Someren, 1975
Charaxes obudoensis van Someren, 1969
Charaxes candiope (Godart, 1824)
Charaxes protoclea protoclea Feisthamel, 1850
Charaxes protoclea protonothodes van Someren, 1971
Charaxes boueti Feisthamel, 1850
Charaxes cynthia cynthia Butler, 1866
Charaxes cynthia kinduana Le Cerf, 1923
Charaxes lucretius lucretius Cramer, [1775]
Charaxes lucretius intermedius van Someren, 1971
Charaxes lactetinctus Karsch, 1892
Charaxes jasius Poulton, 1926
Charaxes epijasius Reiche, 1850
Charaxes legeri Plantrou, 1978
Charaxes castor (Cramer, 1775)
Charaxes brutus brutus (Cramer, 1779)
Charaxes brutus angustus Rothschild, 1900
Charaxes pollux (Cramer, 1775)
Charaxes tectonis Jordan, 1937
Charaxes eudoxus eudoxus (Drury, 1782)
Charaxes eudoxus boersmana Plantrou, 1980
Charaxes eudoxus mechowi Rothschild, 1900
Charaxes numenes numenes (Hewitson, 1859)
Charaxes numenes aequatorialis van Someren, 1972
Charaxes tiridates tiridates (Cramer, 1777)
Charaxes tiridates tiridatinus Röber, 1936
Charaxes bipunctatus Rothschild, 1894
Charaxes smaragdalis Butler, 1866
Charaxes imperialis albipuncta Joicey & Talbot, 1920
Charaxes ameliae ameliae Doumet, 1861
Charaxes ameliae doumeti Henning, 1989
Charaxes pythodoris knoopae Plantrou, 1982
Charaxes pythodoris occidens van Someren, 1963
Charaxes hadrianus Ward, 1871
Charaxes lecerfi Lathy, 192
Charaxes nobilis nobilis Druce, 1873
Charaxes nobilis claudei le Moult, 1933
Charaxes superbus Schultze, 1909
Charaxes zingha (Stoll, 1780)
Charaxes etesipe (Godart, 1824)
Charaxes achaemenes monticola van Someren, 1970
Charaxes eupale eupale (Drury, 1782)
Charaxes eupale latimargo Joicey & Talbot, 1921
Charaxes subornatus subornatus Schultze, 1916
Charaxes subornatus couilloudi Plantrou, 1976
Charaxes anticlea anticlea (Drury, 1782)
Charaxes anticlea proadusta van Someren, 1971
Charaxes hildebrandti hildebrandti (Dewitz, 1879)
Charaxes hildebrandti gillesi Plantrou, 1973
Charaxes virilis van Someren & Jackson, 1952
Charaxes chevroti Collins & Larsen, 2005 (endemic)
Charaxes catachrous van Someren & Jackson, 1952
Charaxes etheocles etheocles (Cramer, 1777)
Charaxes etheocles ochracea van Someren & Jackson, 1957
Charaxes bocqueti oubanguiensis , 1975
Charaxes viola viola Butler, 1866
Charaxes viola picta van Someren & Jackson, 1952
Charaxes northcotti Rothschild, 1899
Charaxes pleione pleione (Godart, 1824)
Charaxes pleione congoensis Plantrou, 1989
Charaxes paphianus paphianus Ward, 1871
Charaxes paphianus falcata (Butler, 1872)
Charaxes nichetes nichetes Grose-Smith, 1883
Charaxes nichetes bouchei Plantrou, 1974
Charaxes nichetes leopardinus Plantrou, 1974
Charaxes lycurgus lycurgus (Fabricius, 1793)
Charaxes lycurgus bernardiana Plantrou, 1978
Charaxes zelica zelica Butler, 1869
Charaxes zelica rougeoti Plantrou, 1978
Charaxes porthos porthos Grose-Smith, 1883
Charaxes porthos gallayi van Someren, 1968
Charaxes doubledayi Aurivillius, 1899
Charaxes mycerina mycerina (Godart, 1824)
Charaxes mycerina nausicaa Staudinger, 1891

Euxanthini
Charaxes eurinome (Cramer, 1775)
Charaxes crossleyi (Ward, 1871)
Charaxes trajanus (Ward, 1871)

Pallini
Palla publius Staudinger, 1892
Palla ussheri (Butler, 1870)
Palla decius (Cramer, 1777)
Palla violinitens violinitens (Crowley, 1890)
Palla violinitens coniger (Butler, 1896)

Apaturinae
Apaturopsis cleochares (Hewitson, 1873)

Nymphalinae
Kallimoides rumia jadyae (Fox, 1968)
Vanessula milca buechneri Dewitz, 1887

Nymphalini
Antanartia delius (Drury, 1782)
Vanessa dimorphica mortoni (Howarth, 1966)
Vanessa cardui (Linnaeus, 1758)
Junonia chorimene (Guérin-Méneville, 1844)
Junonia hierta cebrene Trimen, 1870
Junonia oenone (Linnaeus, 1758)
Junonia orithya madagascariensis Guenée, 1865
Junonia sophia (Fabricius, 1793)
Junonia stygia (Aurivillius, 1894)
Junonia gregorii Butler, 1896
Junonia terea (Drury, 1773)
Junonia westermanni Westwood, 1870
Junonia cymodoce (Cramer, 1777)
Salamis cacta (Fabricius, 1793)
Protogoniomorpha anacardii (Linnaeus, 1758)
Protogoniomorpha parhassus (Drury, 1782)
Protogoniomorpha temora (Felder & Felder, 1867)
Precis antilope (Feisthamel, 1850)
Precis ceryne ceruana Rothschild & Jordan, 190
Precis coelestina Dewitz, 1879
Precis frobeniusi Strand, 1909
Precis milonia Felder & Felder, 1867
Precis octavia (Cramer, 1777)
Precis pelarga (Fabricius, 1775)
Precis rauana silvicola Schultz, 1916
Precis sinuata Plötz, 1880
Hypolimnas anthedon (Doubleday, 1845)
Hypolimnas chapmani (Hewitson, 1873)
Hypolimnas dinarcha (Hewitson, 1865)
Hypolimnas misippus (Linnaeus, 1764)
Hypolimnas monteironis (Druce, 1874)
Hypolimnas salmacis (Drury, 1773)
Catacroptera cloanthe ligata Rothschild & Jordan, 1903

Cyrestinae

Cyrestini
Cyrestis camillus (Fabricius, 1781)

Biblidinae

Biblidini
Byblia anvatara crameri Aurivillius, 1894
Byblia ilithyia (Drury, 1773)
Mesoxantha ethosea ethoseoides Rebel, 1914
Ariadne actisanes (Hewitson, 1875)
Ariadne albifascia (Joicey & Talbot, 1921)
Ariadne enotrea (Cramer, 1779)
Ariadne pagenstecheri (Suffert, 1904)
Neptidopsis ophione (Cramer, 1777)
Eurytela alinda Mabille, 1893
Eurytela dryope (Cramer, [1775])
Eurytela hiarbas (Drury, 1782)

Epicaliini
Sevenia amulia (Cramer, 1777)
Sevenia boisduvali omissa (Rothschild, 1918)
Sevenia garega (Karsch, 1892)
Sevenia occidentalium (Mabille, 1876)
Sevenia pechueli sangbae (Hecq & Peeters, 1992)
Sevenia umbrina (Karsch, 1892)

Limenitinae

Limenitidini
Harma theobene theobene Doubleday, 1848
Harma theobene superna (Fox, 1968)
Cymothoe althea bobi Collins & Larsen, 2000
Cymothoe anitorgis (Hewitson, 1874)
Cymothoe aramis (Hewitson, 1865)
Cymothoe beckeri (Herrich-Schaeffer, 1858)
Cymothoe caenis (Drury, 1773)
Cymothoe capella (Ward, 1871)
Cymothoe coccinata (Hewitson, 1874)
Cymothoe consanguis Aurivillius, 1896
Cymothoe egesta (Cramer, 1775)
Cymothoe confusa Aurivillius, 1887
Cymothoe euthalioides euthalioides Kirby, 1889
Cymothoe euthalioides albomarginata Neustetter, 1921
Cymothoe excelsa Neustetter, 1912
Cymothoe fumana balluca Fox & Howarth, 1968
Cymothoe haimodia (Grose-Smith, 1887)
Cymothoe harmilla (Hewitson, 1874)
Cymothoe heliada (Hewitson, 1874)
Cymothoe herminia (Grose-Smith, 1887)
Cymothoe hesiodina Schultze, 1908
Cymothoe hesiodotus nigeriensis Overlaet, 1952
Cymothoe hyarbita (Hewitson, 1866)
Cymothoe hypatha hypatha (Hewitson, 1866)
Cymothoe hypatha okomu Hecq & Larsen, 1997
Cymothoe indamora (Hewitson, 1866)
Cymothoe jodutta ciceronis (Ward, 1871)
Cymothoe lucasii binotorum Darge, 1985
Cymothoe lurida hesione Weymer, 1907
Cymothoe oemilius (Doumet, 1859)
Cymothoe ogova (Plötz, 1880)
Cymothoe orphnina suavis Schultze, 1913
Cymothoe preussi Staudinger, 1890
Cymothoe reinholdi (Plötz, 1880)
Cymothoe sangaris (Godart, 1824)
Cymothoe weymeri Suffert, 1904
Cymothoe zenkeri Richelmann, 1913
Pseudoneptis bugandensis ianthe Hemming, 1964
Pseudacraea annakae Knoop, 1988
Pseudacraea boisduvalii (Doubleday, 1845)
Pseudacraea clarkii Butler & Rothschild, 1892
Pseudacraea dolomena (Hewitson, 1865)
Pseudacraea rubrobasalis Aurivillius, 1903
Pseudacraea eurytus (Linnaeus, 1758)
Pseudacraea kuenowii gottbergi Dewitz, 1884
Pseudacraea lucretia (Cramer, [1775])
Pseudacraea semire (Cramer, 1779)
Pseudacraea warburgi Aurivillius, 1892

Neptidini
Neptis agouale Pierre-Baltus, 1978
Neptis alta Overlaet, 1955
Neptis biafra Ward, 1871
Neptis camarensis Schultze, 1920
Neptis carlsbergi Collins & Larsen, 2005 (endemic)
Neptis claude Collins & Larsen, 2005
Neptis conspicua Neave, 1904
Neptis constantiae kaumba Condamin, 1966
Neptis loma Condamin, 1971
Neptis continuata Holland, 1892
Neptis jamesoni Godman & Salvin, 1890
Neptis kiriakoffi Overlaet, 1955
Neptis laeta Overlaet, 1955
Neptis liberti Pierre & Pierre-Baltus, 1998
Neptis melicerta (Drury, 1773)
Neptis metanira Holland, 1892
Neptis metella (Doubleday, 1848)
Neptis mixophyes Holland, 1892
Neptis morosa Overlaet, 1955
Neptis nebrodes Hewitson, 1874
Neptis nemetes Hewitson, 1868
Neptis nicobule Holland, 1892
Neptis nicomedes Hewitson, 1874
Neptis quintilla Mabille, 1890
Neptis nicoteles Hewitson, 1874
Neptis nysiades Hewitson, 1868
Neptis occidentalis batesii Hall, 1930
Neptis ochracea mildbraedi Gaede, 1915
Neptis paula Staudinger, 1896
Neptis puella Aurivillius, 1894
Neptis saclava marpessa Hopffer, 1855
Neptis seeldrayersi Aurivillius, 1895
Neptis serena Overlaet, 1955
Neptis strigata Aurivillius, 1894
Neptis trigonophora melicertula Strand, 1912
Neptis troundi Pierre-Baltus, 1978

Adoliadini
Catuna angustatum (Felder & Felder, 1867)
Catuna crithea (Drury, 1773)
Catuna oberthueri Karsch, 1894
Euryphura chalcis (Felder & Felder, 1860)
Euryphura isuka Stoneham, 1935
Euryphura plautilla (Hewitson, 1865)
Euryphura porphyrion (Ward, 1871)
Euryphura togoensis Suffert, 1904
Euryphurana nobilis (Staudinger, 1891)
Harmilla elegans Aurivillius, 1892
Hamanumida daedalus (Fabricius, 1775)
Pseudargynnis hegemone (Godart, 1819)
Aterica galene (Brown, 1776)
Cynandra opis (Drury, 1773)
Euriphene anaxibia Hecq, 1997
Euriphene abasa (Hewitson, 1866)
Euriphene amicia (Hewitson, 1871)
Euriphene ampedusa (Hewitson, 1866)
Euriphene aridatha (Hewitson, 1866)
Euriphene atossa (Hewitson, 1865)
Euriphene atropurpurea (Aurivillius, 1894)
Euriphene atrovirens (Mabille, 1878)
Euriphene barombina (Aurivillius, 1894)
Euriphene coerulea Boisduval, 1847
Euriphene duseni legeriana Hecq, 1987
Euriphene ernestibaumanni (Karsch, 1895)
Euriphene gambiae gabonica Bernardi, 1966
Euriphene glaucopis (Gaede, 1916)
Euriphene goniogramma (Karsch, 1894)
Euriphene grosesmithi (Staudinger, 1891)
Euriphene incerta (Aurivillius, 1912)
Euriphene karschi (Aurivillius, 1894)
Euriphene kiki Bernardi & Larsen, 1980 (endemic)
Euriphene milnei (Hewitson, 1865)
Euriphene mundula (Grünberg, 1910)
Euriphene obani Wojtusiak & Knoop, 1994
Euriphene obtusangula (Aurivillius, 1912)
Euriphene pavo (Howarth, 1959)
Euriphene plagiata (Aurivillius, 1897)
Euriphene bernaudi Hecq, 1994
Euriphene tadema (Hewitson, 1866)
Euriphene doriclea (Drury, 1782)
Euriphene lysandra (Stoll, 1790)
Euriphene paralysandra d'Abrera, 2004 (endemic)
Bebearia denticula Hecq, 2000 (endemic)
Bebearia lucayensis Hecq, 1996
Bebearia tentyris (Hewitson, 1866)
Bebearia carshena (Hewitson, 1871)
Bebearia absolon (Fabricius, 1793)
Bebearia micans (Aurivillius, 1899)
Bebearia zonara (Butler, 1871)
Bebearia mandinga (Felder & Felder, 1860)
Bebearia oxione (Hewitson, 1866)
Bebearia abesa (Hewitson, 1869)
Bebearia barce maculata (Aurivillius, 1912)
Bebearia comus (Ward, 1871)
Bebearia mardania (Fabricius, 1793)
Bebearia cocalioides hecqi Holmes, 2001
Bebearia guineensis (Felder & Felder, 1867)
Bebearia cocalia continentalis Hecq, 1988
Bebearia cocalia katera (van Someren, 1939)
Bebearia paludicola Holmes, 2001
Bebearia sophus (Fabricius, 1793)
Bebearia staudingeri okomu Collins & Larsen, 2008
Bebearia plistonax (Hewitson, 1874)
Bebearia elpinice (Hewitson, 1869)
Bebearia occitana Hecq, 1989
Bebearia phranza (Hewitson, 1865)
Bebearia laetitia (Plötz, 1880)
Bebearia flaminia flaminia (Staudinger, 1891)
Bebearia flaminia leventisi Hecq & Larsen, 1997
Bebearia maximiana (Staudinger, 1891)
Bebearia omo Larsen & Warren, 2005
Bebearia nivaria (Ward, 1871)
Bebearia phantasia (Hewitson, 1865)
Bebearia phantasina (Staudinger, 1891)
Bebearia phantasiella (Staudinger, 1891)
Bebearia demetra (Godart, 1824)
Bebearia maledicta (Strand, 1912)
Bebearia tessmanni innocuoides Hecq, 2000
Bebearia cutteri (Hewitson, 1865)
Bebearia innocua (Grose-Smith & Kirby, 1889)
Bebearia eliensis scrutata Hecq, 1989
Bebearia barombina (Staudinger, 1896)
Bebearia octogramma (Grose-Smith & Kirby, 1889)
Bebearia fontaineana vinula Hecq, 1987
Euphaedra luperca (Hewitson, 1864)
Euphaedra fucora Hecq, 1979
Euphaedra imperialis gabonica Rothschild, 1918
Euphaedra imperialis hecqui Darge, 1974
Euphaedra medon (Linnaeus, 1763)
Euphaedra athena Hecq & Joly, 2003 (endemic)
Euphaedra extensa Hecq, 1981
Euphaedra zaddachii elephantina Staudinger, 1891
Euphaedra xypete (Hewitson, 1865)
Euphaedra hewitsoni sumptuosa Hecq, 1974
Euphaedra acuta Hecq, 1977
Euphaedra diffusa diffusa Gaede, 1916
Euphaedra diffusa albocoerulea Hecq, 1976
Euphaedra mirabilis Hecq, 1980
Euphaedra crossei Sharpe, 1902
Euphaedra imitans Holland, 1893
Euphaedra cyparissa aurata Carpenter, 1895
Euphaedra sarcoptera (Butler, 1871)
Euphaedra themis (Hübner, 1807)
Euphaedra permixtum diva Hecq, 1982
Euphaedra aureola nitens Hecq, 1997
Euphaedra exerrata Hecq, 1982
Euphaedra janetta (Butler, 1871)
Euphaedra splendens Hecq, 1992
Euphaedra justicia Staudinger, 1886
Euphaedra adonina (Hewitson, 1865)
Euphaedra controversa Hecq, 1997
Euphaedra ceres lutescens Hecq, 1979
Euphaedra phaethusa (Butler, 1866)
Euphaedra viridicaerulea Bartel, 1905
Euphaedra ravola (Hewitson, 1866)
Euphaedra margaritifera Schultze, 1920
Euphaedra preussiana protea Hecq, 1983
Euphaedra rezia (Hewitson, 1866)
Euphaedra proserpina Hecq, 1983
Euphaedra nigrocilia Lathy, 1903 (endemic)
Euphaedra wojtusiaki Hecq, 1993 (endemic)
Euphaedra luteolucens Hecq, 1995 (endemic)
Euphaedra knoopiana Hecq, 1995 (endemic)
Euphaedra dargeana Hecq, 1980
Euphaedra demeter Hecq, 1983
Euphaedra velutina Hecq, 1997
Euphaedra densamacula Hecq, 1997
Euphaedra compacta Hecq, 1997
Euphaedra vicina longiqua Hecq, 1984
Euphaedra eleus (Drury, 1782)
Euphaedra simplex Hecq, 1978
Euphaedra ferruginea Staudinger, 1886
Euphaedra semipreussiana Hecq, 1993
Euphaedra castanoides gashaka Hecq, 1996
Euphaedra edwardsii (van der Hoeven, 1845)
Euphaedra ruspina (Hewitson, 1865)
Euphaedra harpalyce harpalyce (Cramer, 1777)
Euphaedra harpalyce evanescens Hecq, 1995
Euphaedra losinga losinga (Hewitson, 1864)
Euphaedra losinga wardi (Druce, 1874)
Euphaedra losinga knoopi Hecq, 1988
Euphaedra viridirupta Hecq, 2007
Euphaedra larseni Hecq, 2005 (endemic)
Euphaedra mambili Hecq, 2001
Euptera amieti Collins & Libert, 1998
Euptera crowleyi (Kirby, 1889)
Euptera elabontas (Hewitson, 1871)
Euptera hirundo Staudinger, 1891
Euptera knoopi Libert & Chovet, 1998 (endemic)
Euptera mimetica Collins & Amiet, 1998
Euptera neptunus Joicey & Talbot, 1924
Euptera nigeriensis Chovet, 1998 (endemic)
Euptera pluto (Ward, 1873)
Euptera zowa Fox, 1965
Pseudathyma callina (Grose-Smith, 1898)
Pseudathyma falcata Jackson, 1969
Pseudathyma legeri Larsen & Boorman, 1995 (endemic)
Pseudathyma martini Collins, 2002
Pseudathyma plutonica sibyllina (Staudinger, 1890)

Heliconiinae

Acraeini
Acraea kraka Aurivillius, 1893
Acraea admatha Hewitson, 1865
Acraea camaena (Drury, 1773)
Acraea endoscota Le Doux, 1928
Acraea eugenia Karsch, 1893
Acraea leucographa Ribbe, 1889
Acraea neobule Doubleday, 1847
Acraea quirina (Fabricius, 1781)
Acraea zetes (Linnaeus, 1758)
Acraea abdera abdera Hewitson, 1852
Acraea abdera eginopsis Aurivillius, 1899
Acraea cepheus (Linnaeus, 1758)
Acraea egina (Cramer, 1775)
Acraea caecilia (Fabricius, 1781)
Acraea pseudegina Westwood, 1852
Acraea rogersi Hewitson, 1873
Acraea sykesi Sharpe, 1902
Acraea alcinoe Felder & Felder, 1865
Acraea consanguinea (Aurivillius, 1893)
Acraea elongata (Butler, 1874)
Acraea epaea (Cramer, 1779)
Acraea epiprotea (Butler, 1874)
Acraea excisa (Butler, 1874)
Acraea obliqua (Aurivillius, 1913)
Acraea tellus (Aurivillius, 1893)
Acraea umbra (Drury, 1782)
Acraea vestalis Felder & Felder, 1865
Acraea acerata Hewitson, 1874
Acraea actinotina (Lathy, 1903) (endemic)
Acraea alciope Hewitson, 1852
Acraea pseudepaea Dudgeon, 1909
Acraea aurivillii Staudinger, 1896
Acraea bonasia (Fabricius, 1775)
Acraea circeis (Drury, 1782)
Acraea encedana Pierre, 1976
Acraea encedon (Linnaeus, 1758)
Acraea serena (Fabricius, 1775)
Acraea iturina Grose-Smith, 1890
Acraea jodutta (Fabricius, 1793)
Acraea lycoa Godart, 1819
Acraea oberthueri Butler, 1895
Acraea orestia Hewitson, 1874
Acraea peneleos Ward, 1871
Acraea polis Pierre, 1999
Acraea pharsalus Ward, 1871
Acraea karschi Aurivillius, 1899
Acraea uvui balina Karsch, 1892
Acraea vesperalis Grose-Smith, 1890
Acraea viviana Staudinger, 1896
Acraea kaduna Pierre, 1993 (endemic)
Acraea alticola Schultze, 1923
Acraea oreas oboti Collins & Larsen, 2000
Acraea orina Hewitson, 1874
Acraea parrhasia parrhasia (Fabricius, 1793)
Acraea parrhasia servona Godart, 1819
Acraea penelope Staudinger, 1896
Acraea translucida Eltringham, 1912
Acraea perenna Doubleday, 1847

Argynnini
Issoria baumanni excelsior (Butler, 1896)

Vagrantini
Lachnoptera anticlia (Hübner, 1819)
Phalanta eurytis (Doubleday, 1847)
Phalanta phalantha aethiopica (Rothschild & Jordan, 1903)

Hesperiidae

Coeliadinae
Coeliades bixana Evans, 1940
Coeliades chalybe (Westwood, 1852)
Coeliades forestan (Stoll, [1782])
Coeliades hanno (Plötz, 1879)
Coeliades libeon (Druce, 1875)
Coeliades pisistratus (Fabricius, 1793)
Pyrrhochalcia iphis (Drury, 1773)

Pyrginae

Celaenorrhinini
Loxolexis dimidia (Holland, 1896)
Loxolexis hollandi (Druce, 1909)
Loxolexis holocausta (Mabille, 1891)
Katreus johnstoni (Butler, 1888)
Celaenorrhinus bettoni Butler, 1902
Celaenorrhinus boadicea (Hewitson, 1877)
Celaenorrhinus chrysoglossa (Mabille, 1891)
Celaenorrhinus galenus (Fabricius, 1793)
Celaenorrhinus illustris (Mabille, 1891)
Celaenorrhinus meditrina (Hewitson, 1877)
Celaenorrhinus ovalis Evans, 1937
Celaenorrhinus perlustris mona Evans, 1937
Celaenorrhinus plagiatus Berger, 1976
Celaenorrhinus pooanus Aurivillius, 1910
Celaenorrhinus proxima maesseni Berger, 1976
Celaenorrhinus rutilans (Mabille, 1877)
Eretis lugens (Rogenhofer, 1891)
Eretis melania Mabille, 1891
Eretis plistonicus (Plötz, 1879)
Sarangesa bouvieri (Mabille, 1877)
Sarangesa brigida (Plötz, 1879)
Sarangesa laelius (Mabille, 1877)
Sarangesa majorella (Mabille, 1891)
Sarangesa phidyle (Walker, 1870)
Sarangesa tertullianus (Fabricius, 1793)
Sarangesa thecla (Plötz, 1879)

Tagiadini
Tagiades flesus (Fabricius, 1781)
Eagris decastigma decastigma Mabille, 1891
Eagris decastigma fuscosa (Holland, 1893)
Eagris denuba (Plötz, 1879)
Eagris hereus quaterna (Mabille, 1890)
Eagris subalbida (Holland, 1893)
Eagris tetrastigma tetrastigma (Mabille, 1891)
Eagris tetrastigma subolivescens (Holland, 1892)
Eagris tigris liberti Collins & Larsen, 2005
Calleagris lacteus lacteus (Mabille, 1877)
Calleagris lacteus dannatti (Ehrmann, 1893)
Calleagris landbecki (Druce, 1910)
Procampta rara Holland, 1892
Caprona adelica Karsch, 1892
Caprona pillaana Wallengren, 1857
Netrobalane canopus (Trimen, 1864)
Abantis bismarcki Karsch, 1892
Abantis elegantula (Mabille, 1890)
Abantis leucogaster (Mabille, 1890)
Abantis lucretia Druce, 1909
Abantis nigeriana Butler, 1901
Abantis paradisea (Butler, 1870)
Abantis pseudonigeriana Usher, 1984
Abantis rubra Holland, 1920

Carcharodini
Spialia diomus (Hopffer, 1855)
Spialia dromus (Plötz, 1884)
Spialia spio (Linnaeus, 1764)
Gomalia elma (Trimen, 1862)

Hesperiinae

Aeromachini
Astictopterus abjecta (Snellen, 1872)
Prosopalpus debilis (Plötz, 1879)
Prosopalpus styla Evans, 1937
Kedestes callicles (Hewitson, 1868)
Kedestes protensa Butler, 1901
Gorgyra aburae (Plötz, 1879)
Gorgyra afikpo Druce, 1909
Gorgyra aretina (Hewitson, 1878)
Gorgyra bina Evans, 1937
Gorgyra warreni Collins & Larsen, 2008
Gorgyra bule Miller, 1964
Gorgyra diversata Evans, 1937
Gorgyra heterochrus (Mabille, 1890)
Gorgyra kalinzu Evans, 1949
Gorgyra minima Holland, 1896
Gorgyra mocquerysii Holland, 1896
Gorgyra pali Evans, 1937
Gorgyra rubescens Holland, 1896
Gorgyra sara Evans, 1937
Gorgyra sola Evans, 1937
Gorgyra subfacatus (Mabille, 1890)
Gyrogra subnotata (Holland, 1894)
Teniorhinus ignita (Mabille, 1877)
Teniorhinus watsoni Holland, 1892
Ceratrichia argyrosticta (Plötz, 1879)
Ceratrichia clara Evans, 1937
Ceratrichia flava Hewitson, 1878
Ceratrichia lewisi Collins & Larsen, 2000 (endemic)
Ceratrichia nothus enantia (Karsch, 1893)
Ceratrichia nothus makomensis Strand, 1913
Ceratrichia phocion (Fabricius, 1781)
Ceratrichia semilutea Mabille, 1891
Pardaleodes edipus (Stoll, 1781)
Pardaleodes fan (Holland, 1894)
Pardaleodes incerta murcia (Plötz, 1883)
Pardaleodes sator (Westwood, 1852)
Pardaleodes tibullus (Fabricius, 1793)
Pardaleodes xanthopeplus Holland, 1892
Xanthodisca astrape (Holland, 1892)
Xanthodisca rega (Mabille, 1890)
Acada annulifer (Holland, 1892)
Rhabdomantis galatia (Hewitson, 1868)
Rhabdomantis sosia (Mabille, 1891)
Osmodes adon (Mabille, 1890)
Osmodes adonia Evans, 1937
Osmodes adosus (Mabille, 1890)
Osmodes costatus Aurivillius, 1896
Osmodes distincta Holland, 1896
Osmodes hollandi Evans, 1937
Osmodes laronia (Hewitson, 1868)
Osmodes lindseyi Miller, 1964
Osmodes lux Holland, 1892
Osmodes omar Swinhoe, 1916
Osmodes thora (Plötz, 1884)
Parosmodes lentiginosa (Holland, 1896)
Parosmodes morantii axis Evans, 1937
Paracleros biguttulus (Mabille, 1890)
Paracleros maesseni Berger, 1978
Paracleros substrigata (Holland, 1893)
Osphantes ogowena (Mabille, 1891)
Acleros mackenii olaus (Plötz, 1884)
Acleros nigrapex Strand, 1913
Acleros ploetzi Mabille, 1890
Semalea arela (Mabille, 1891)
Semalea atrio (Mabille, 1891)
Semalea kola Evans, 1937
Semalea pulvina (Plötz, 1879)
Semalea sextilis (Plötz, 1886)
Hypoleucis sophia Evans, 1937
Hypoleucis tripunctata truda Evans, 1937
Meza banda (Evans, 1937)
Meza cybeutes cybeutes (Holland, 1894)
Meza cybeutes volta Miller, 1971
Meza elba (Evans, 1937)
Meza indusiata (Mabille, 1891)
Meza leucophaea (Holland, 1894)
Meza mabillei (Holland, 1893)
Meza meza (Hewitson, 1877)
Paronymus budonga (Evans, 1938)
Paronymus nevea (Druce, 1910)
Paronymus xanthias (Mabille, 1891)
Paronymus xanthioides (Holland, 1892)
Andronymus caesar (Fabricius, 1793)
Andronymus evander (Mabille, 1890)
Andronymus gander Evans, 1947
Andronymus helles Evans, 1937
Andronymus hero Evans, 1937
Andronymus neander (Plötz, 1884)
Chondrolepis nero Evans, 1937
Chondrolepis niveicornis (Plötz, 1883)
Zophopetes cerymica (Hewitson, 1867)
Zophopetes ganda Evans, 1937
Gamia buchholzi (Plötz, 1879)
Gamia shelleyi (Sharpe, 1890)
Artitropa comus (Stoll, 1782)
Mopala orma (Plötz, 1879)
Gretna balenge (Holland, 1891)
Gretna cylinda (Hewitson, 1876)
Gretna lacida (Hewitson, 1876)
Gretna waga (Plötz, 1886)
Gretna zaremba (Plötz, 1884)
Pteroteinon caenira (Hewitson, 1867)
Pteroteinon capronnieri (Plötz, 1879)
Pteroteinon ceucaenira (Druce, 1910)
Pteroteinon concaenira Belcastro & Larsen, 1996
Pteroteinon iricolor (Holland, 1890)
Pteroteinon laterculus (Holland, 1890)
Pteroteinon laufella (Hewitson, 1868)
Pteroteinon pruna Evans, 1937
Leona binoevatus (Mabille, 1891)
Leona maracanda (Hewitson, 1876)
Leona lena Evans, 1937
Leona leonora (Plötz, 1879)
Leona meloui (Riley, 1926)
Leona halma Evans, 1937
Leona lissa Evans, 1937
Leona luehderi (Plötz, 1879)
Caenides soritia (Hewitson, 1876)
Caenides kangvensis Holland, 1896
Caenides benga (Holland, 1891)
Caenides otilia Belcastro, 1990
Caenides dacenilla Aurivillius, 1925
Caenides dacela (Hewitson, 1876)
Caenides hidaroides Aurivillius, 1896
Caenides dacena (Hewitson, 1876)
Monza alberti (Holland, 1896)
Monza cretacea (Snellen, 1872)
Melphina flavina Lindsey & Miller, 1965
Melphina malthina (Hewitson, 1876)
Melphina melphis (Holland, 1893)
Melphina noctula (Druce, 1909)
Melphina statira (Mabille, 1891)
Melphina tarace (Mabille, 1891)
Melphina unistriga (Holland, 1893)
Fresna carlo Evans, 1937
Fresna cojo (Karsch, 1893)
Fresna netopha (Hewitson, 1878)
Fresna nyassae (Hewitson, 1878)
Platylesches affinissima Strand, 1921
Platylesches batangae (Holland, 1894)
Platylesches chamaeleon (Mabille, 1891)
Platylesches galesa (Hewitson, 1877)
Platylesches iva Evans, 1937
Platylesches langa Evans, 1937
Platylesches moritili (Wallengren, 1857)
Platylesches picanini (Holland, 1894)

Baorini
Zenonia zeno (Trimen, 1864)
Pelopidas mathias (Fabricius, 1798)
Pelopidas thrax (Hübner, 1821)
Borbo binga (Evans, 1937)
Borbo borbonica (Boisduval, 1833)
Borbo fallax (Gaede, 1916)
Borbo fanta (Evans, 1937)
Borbo fatuellus (Hopffer, 1855)
Borbo gemella (Mabille, 1884)
Borbo holtzi (Plötz, 1883)
Borbo micans (Holland, 1896)
Borbo perobscura (Druce, 1912)
Parnara monasi (Trimen & Bowker, 1889)
Gegenes hottentota (Latreille, 1824)
Gegenes niso brevicornis (Plötz, 1884)
Gegenes pumilio gambica (Mabille, 1878)

Heteropterinae
Metisella kambove gamma de Jong
Metisella kumbona Evans, 1937
Metisella medea Evans, 1937
Metisella midas malda Evans, 1937
Metisella tsadicus (Aurivillius, 1905)
Lepella lepeletier (Latreille, 1824)

See also
List of moths of Nigeria
Wildlife of Nigeria

References

Seitz, A. Die Gross-Schmetterlinge der Erde 13: Die Afrikanischen Tagfalter. Plates
Seitz, A. Die Gross-Schmetterlinge der Erde 13: Die Afrikanischen Tagfalter. Text 

Nigeria

Nigeria
Butterflies
Nigeria